Brda is a village in the municipality of Kalinovik, Bosnia and Herzegovina.

References

Villages in Republika Srpska
Populated places in Kalinovik